Helichrysum sphaerocephalum is a species of flowering plant in the family Asteraceae.
It is found only in Yemen.
Its natural habitats are subtropical or tropical dry forests, subtropical or tropical dry shrubland, and rocky areas.

References

sphaerocephalum
Endemic flora of Socotra
Least concern plants
Taxonomy articles created by Polbot